Philomena Theresa Gianfrancisco (later Zale; April 20, 1923 – January 18, 1992) was an outfielder who played from  through  in the All-American Girls Professional Baseball League.

Born in Chicago, Illinois, Gianfrancisco had the longest name in league history. Nicknamed ״Phil״ or ״Frisco״ by her teammates, she joined the league in 1945 with the Grand Rapids Chicks, playing for them three years before joining the Racine Belles (1948).

Her most productive season came in 1946, when she posted a career-best .226 batting average in 98 games, ranking eighth in runs batted in (53) and ninth in doubles (9), while tying for sixth in home runs (2).

In 1947, Gianfrancisco suffered a severe knee injury, which sidelined her for most of the season. She then underwent surgery to correct a major problem. In 1948 she came back and helped Racine to reach the postseason, appearing in a career-high 114 games while batting .204 with four homers and 45 RBI. Two years later, in 1949, she left the league to become boxer Tony Zale's manager and booking agent. The two married in 1970. She worked as a physical education teacher for more than 25 years and specialized in teaching the hearing impaired at St. Francis De Sales Catholic High School in Chicago and for the Chicago Park District.

Gianfrancisco is part of Women in Baseball, a permanent display based at the Baseball Hall of Fame and Museum in Cooperstown, New York, which was unveiled in 1988 to honor the entire All-American Girls Professional Baseball League. She died four years later in her hometown of Chicago at the age of 68.

Career statistics
Batting

Fielding

References

External links
"Jerre DeNoble, Philomena Gianfrancisco, and Mildred Earp at Morro Castle during Spring Training in Cuba photograph, 1947". National Baseball Hall of Fame. Retrieved 2019-04-10.
"Philomena Gianfrancisco at the Jai Alai Fronton during Spring Training in Cuba photograph, 1947". National Baseball Hall of Fame. Retrieved 2019-04-10.

All-American Girls Professional Baseball League players
Grand Rapids Chicks players
Racine Belles (1943–1950) players
American people of Italian descent
1923 births
1992 deaths
Baseball players from Chicago
20th-century American women